The Zangezur Mountains are a mountain range that defines the border between Armenia's southern provinces of Syunik, Vayots Dzor, and Azerbaijan's  Nakhchivan Autonomous Republic. The Zangezur region is internationally recognized as being the second-largest tract of forests in Armenia, located in the Zangezur Mountains where they cover more than 20% of the territory of Armenian Syunik province and reach an elevation of 2,200-2,400 m (4,000 feet).

Conservation 
Part of the Zangezur Mountains in Armenia is included in the Arevik National Park. There are also three Prime Butterfly Areas (PBA) designated and one proposed at the eastern slopes of the Zangezur Mountains. In the Nakhchivan exclave of Azerbaijan, the mountains are included within the Zangezur National Park, located in the north of Ordubad District.

Gallery

See also 
 Geography of Armenia
 Geography of Azerbaijan

References

External links 

Mountain ranges of Armenia
Mountain ranges of Azerbaijan